Mathieu-François Pidansat Mairobert (born 20 February 1727 in Chaource; died 27 March 1779 in Paris) was a French writer.

Biography 
He is the son of François Pierre Pidansat, bailiff of the duchy-peerage of Aumont, commissioner lieutenant judge for the municipality of Paris (1727), and of Nicole Picardat.  He is the maternal uncle of Jean Nicolas Jacques Parisot (1757-1838).

Raised by Marie Anne Doublet de Persan, of whom he claimed to be the son, he soon found himself mixed up in the conversations and quarrels of the world of letters. He occupied the position of royal censor and the title of secretary of the king for the Duke of Chartres. Until his death, he also contributed to the cultural and political chronicle "Mémoires Secrets," traditionally attributed to Louis Petit de Bachaumont. His close ties to the "Parti Patriote" and links to Restif de la Bretonne led him to be monitored by the police.

In 1779, he was compromised during the trial of the Marquis de Brunoy, of whom he was the creditor for a considerable sum. Although it was thought that he was only acting as an agent of a higher person, the Parliament of Paris inflicted a public reprimand on him by decree on 27 March 1779. Believing himself disgraced, Mairobert went that evening to a bathhouse, where he opened his veins with a razor in the bath before ending his life with a pistol. The parish priest of the Church of St. Eustache of Paris only consented to bury him upon the King's express order. Restif de la Bretonne mourned him bitterly, and went every year, on the anniversary of his suicide, to see his house to commemorate the date.

Works
 Querelle de M.M. de Voltaire et de Maupertuis (1753) 
 Correspondance secrète, et familière du chancelier de Maupeou avec Sorhouet (1771, in-12), a radical pamphlet reprinted under the title of Maupeouana (1773, 2 vol. in-12) 
 Principes sur la Marine, (manuscript in-8°, 1775).
 Anecdotes sur la comtesse du Barry (London, 1775, in-12), one of the best sellers of the late 18th  century, attributed to Théveneau de Morande.
 L'Observateur anglais (London [Amsterdam], 1777-1778, 4 vol. in-12), several times reprinted under the title of l’Espion anglais (lire en ligne)
  Lettres de "Madame du Barry (London, 1779, in-12).

References 

1727 births
1779 deaths
People from Aube
18th-century French writers
18th-century French male writers
18th-century suicides